The discography of K'naan, a Somali Canadian rapper and singer, consists of four studio albums, one live album, one extended play and 21 singles (including eight as a featured performer and seven promotional releases).

Albums

Studio albums

Live albums

Mixtapes
K'naan : You Can't Buy This (Mixed By K-Salaam & Beatnick)
K'naan & J.Period: The Messengers 1 (Fela Kuti)
K'naan & J.Period: The Messengers 2 (Bob Marley)
K'naan & J.Period: The Messengers 3 (Bob Dylan)

Extended plays

Singles

As lead artist

As featured artist

Promotional singles

Soundtracks
2011: Beat The World

References

Discographies of Canadian artists
Discographies of Somalian artists
Hip hop discographies